Valerio Binasco (born  20 June 1964) is an Italian actor, stage director, and playwright.

Life and career 
Born in Paderna, Binasco graduated at the drama school of the Stabile di Genova, where he made his professional debut in 1987. He won two Ubu Awards, in 1999 for playing Hamlet in an adaptation directed by Carlo Cecchi and in 2004 for playing Polynices in a stage adaptation of Oedipus at Colonus directed by Mario Martone. Also active in films, in 2016 Binasco was nominated for David di Donatello for Best Supporting Actor thanks to his performance in Alaska.

Selected filmography 
 This Is Not Paradise (2000) 
 Domenica (2001)
 Two Friends (2002)
 Working Slowly (Radio Alice) (2004) 
 The Beast in the Heart (2005) 
 Texas (2005)
 Don't Make Any Plans for Tonight (2006) 
 A Perfect Day (2008) 
 Blood of the Losers (2008) 
 Noi credevamo (2010)
 Leopardi (2014)
 Alaska (2015)
 Lord of the Ants (2022)

References

External links 

 
 

1964 births
20th-century Italian male actors
21st-century Italian male actors
Italian male film actors
Italian male television actors
Italian male stage actors
Italian theatre directors 
Italian dramatists and playwrights
People from the Province of Alessandria
Living people